Akis is a Malaysian animated show that is produced by Inspedia and distributed by Nickelodeon which premiered on 28 September 2012. The series was later uploaded to Nickelodeon's Facebook page.

Cast
 Jojie as Akis (uncredited)

Characters

Main Characters
 Akis - The main primary character of the show as well as the namesake of it. Akis is 7 years old. She appears in every episode. She is seen wearing a lavender dress with a pink cat face on it and sometimes her school uniform when she's at school. Her interests are pretending, worms and anything fun.
 Ms. Eisha - Akis' mother and the wife of Mr. Ali. She is seen wearing a pinkish-purple shirt with a dark blue skirt and an apron. Ms. Eisha isn't usually amused by Akis' escapades, bit still loves her as a daughter. (Number of appearances = 5 episodes)
 Mr. Ali - Akis' father and the husband of Ms. Eisha. Mr. Ali shares the same personality with his wife, as they both can sometimes not be amused by Akis's escapades, but still loves her as their daughter. (Number of Appearances = 5 episodes)
 Iwan - Akis' little brother. Throughout the show, Iwan never had a speaking role and he only appeared in two episodes, "Why Oh Why" and "The Artist".

Recurring Characters
 Miss Rosi - Akis' class teacher. Throughout the show, Miss Rosi had always been such a fuss with Akis, as Akis is as playful as can be. Whenever Akis does something amusing with her classmates, Miss Rosi will try her best to stop it. (Number of Appearances = 5 episodes)
 The Principal - The Principal was first heard in "Cooking Class" where an announcement was made during Miss Rosi's class. He accidentally caused a malfunction and had to call over Miss Rosi to help him. He was then physically seen in "The Unscheduled Drill". (Number of Appearances = 3 episodes)
 Sports Teacher - The sports teacher only appears in "The Unscheduled Drill" as one of the teachers helping Miss Rosi to look for the students.
 Makeup Artist - A man who hates Akis and calls her a "meddler". He only appears in "The Artist". At the end of the said episode, the makeup artist makes the hypermarket owner charge the family $1,000 for the havoc Akis caused when she was pretending to be an artist.
 Naim - One of Akis's classmates - Naim is somewhat shy and is one of Akis' friends at school. He also has a love interest for Akis as first shown in the episode "Talent Show". (Number of Appearances = 6 episodes)
 Yuyi - One of Akis' classmates - Yuyi is a Chinese girl who is also one of Akis' friends at school. Yuyi's thoughts on Akis is that every time Akis does something "fun", she always disagrees of what Akis says and never enjoys Akis' ideas but continues being her friend no matter what happens. (Number of Appearances = 5 episodes)
 Unknown Boy - One of Akis' classmates - another classmate of Akis. He was first seen in "Freedom In Museum". The weird thing about this character is that we never see or hear what his name actually is. He's slightly chubby and likes to play with toys and video games.

Episodes
On June 7, 2019, Nickelodeon Asia's Facebook page officially uploaded the first Akis episode, "Cooking Class" and ended with their last episode, "Family Drama" on August 14, 2019. This was probably due to the fact that Akis is less shown on Malaysian television nowadays. The list below is all 12 episodes.

 Episode 1 - "Cooking Class"
 When her teacher has to go out of the class for a few minutes, Akis decides to host her own "cooking class" to pass the time.
 Episode 2 - "Off The Cough"
 Akis pretends to be a doctor for the day.
 Episode 3 - "The Worm Hunter"
While having fun gardening, Akis discovers some cute worms. But her mother is terrified of them.
 Episode 4 - "Freedom in Museum"
 During a field trip to the museum, Miss Rosi accidentally breaks the door handle to the lunch room, so Akis decides to show the meaning of freedom by finding another way in.
 Episode 5 - "Talent Show"
 Akis decides to be the host of the school's talent show.
 Episode 6 - "Why Oh Why"
 After watching a drama, Akis becomes so influenced by the actor yelling "why?!" that she pretends to be a drama actor herself.
 Episode 7 - "The Artist"
 Akis' latest escapade, pretending to become an artist after seeing her mother being brushed with makeup by a makeup artist, go bad when she unintentionally causes havoc in the hypermarket.
 Episode 8 - "The Unscheduled Drill"
 After a fire drill, Akis and her friends pretend to "escape during an alien invasion drill" at school.
 Episode 9 - "The Guhr-Guhr Monster""
 At a party, Akis persuades a boy to get him to eat his vegetables by playing with food.
 Episode 10 - "Canteen Scene Investigator"
 During recess at school, Akis (as a detective) tries to solve the case of who took a bite of the currypuff.
 Episode 11 - "Spider Boo-Boo"
 When the school bus breaks down during a field trip, Akis pretends to be a travel guide. When her friend shows off his toy spider, things get out of control.
 Episode 12 - "Family Drama"
 Akis plays pretend with her mother. But soon, her mother gets fed up when Akis pretends to be her father.

References

External links

2012 Malaysian television series debuts
2012 Malaysian television series endings
Animated television series about children
Malaysian children's animated television series
Nickelodeon original programming